Gar Moon defeated Harry Hopman 6–3, 6–1, 6–3 in the final to win the men's singles tennis title at the 1930 Australian Championships.

Seeds
The seeded players are listed below. Gar Moon is the champion; others show the round in which they were eliminated.

 Jack Crawford (semifinals)
 Harry Hopman (finalist)
 Gar Moon (champion)
 Jim Willard (semifinals)
 Jack Cummings (quarterfinals)
 Bob Schlesinger (quarterfinals)
 Jack Hawkes (second round)
 Clifford Sproule (quarterfinals)

Draw

Key
 Q = Qualifier
 WC = Wild card
 LL = Lucky loser
 r = Retired

Finals

Earlier rounds

Section 1

Section 2

Eliminating round

In order to eliminate byes the council of L.T.A.A. decided that in case of events for which there were more than the number of entries acceptable, a preliminary elimination tournament should be played.

Eliminating matches were played on Saturday, 18 January:

 Max Noble d.  Adrian Quist 7–5, 5–7, 8–6, 6–4
 Basil Fitchett d.  George Thomas 6–0, 6–4, 6–2
 Bert Tonkin d.  Jack Busst 6–0, 6–4, 6–8, 7–5
 F. McCracken d.  Allan Knight 6–2, 6–3, 4–6, 6–1
 Bruce Walker d.  Horace Crebbin 7–5, 9–7, 6–3
 Dave Thompson d.  Bill Halliday 6–3, 6–2, 6–4
 Harold Doctor d.  Gerald Gaffy w/o
 John Grinstead d.  Bill Simpson 6–1, 6–2, 4–6, 6–3
 Gemmell Payne d.  Max Carpenter 6–4, 4–6, 6–3, 6–4
 Vic Beament d.  Keith Dalgleish 7–5, 8–6, 6–2
 Angus Smith d.  Norman Mussen 6–4, 5–7, 5–7, 6–4, 8–6
( J. S. D. Sweeting d.  Cec Cranfield 7–5, 9–7, 8–6)

Notes

References

External links
 
  Source for seedings

1930
1930 in Australian tennis
Men's Singles